Kevin Emerson is an author of young adult books and is the lead singer for the band Central Services' The Board of Education.

Biography
Kevin Emerson grew up in Cheshire, Connecticut and went to Colby College. His past careers were as a banker, camp counselor, and an elementary school teacher. He currently is a volunteer at 826 Seattle, a chapter of 826 National, a non-profit writing and tutoring for youths 6-18 founded by writer Dave Eggers.

Band
Central Services' The Board of Education is a band that sings educational music for kids and the band's songs charted nationally on college radio. They released an album called Central Services Presents... The Board of Education

Books
His books are Carlos is Gonna Get It, The Fellowship For Alien Detection and the vampire series Oliver Nocturne and The Chronicle of the Dark Star. He has also written The Lost Code Series.

Reception
R.J. Carter of the Trades said that the first Oliver Nocturne book is creepy, good for kids eight and up, and he gave the book a B+.  Wendy Hines of Armchair Interviews said that she highly recommends the first Olver Nocturne book.

References

External links

Colby College alumni
Living people
American children's musicians
American horror writers
Year of birth missing (living people)